The 2020–21 Providence Friars Men's ice hockey season was the 70th season of play for the program and the 37th season in the Hockey East conference. The Friars represented Providence College and were coached by Nate Leaman, in his 10th season.

Season
As a result of the ongoing COVID-19 pandemic the entire college ice hockey season was delayed. Because the NCAA had previously announced that all winter sports athletes would retain whatever eligibility they possessed through at least the following year, none of Providence's players would lose a season of play. However, the NCAA also approved a change in its transfer regulations that would allow players to transfer and play immediately rather than having to sit out a season, as the rules previously required.

Providence got off to a bad start, surrendering 12 goals in their opening weekend to Boston College. Afterwards, sophomore transfer Jaxson Stauber, son of Hobey Baker-recipient Robb Stauber, took over in net and the team saw immediate improvement. The Friars were able to remain in the top-20 for the remainder of the season but the team was never able to put a consistent string of wins together to get them either into the top-10 or among the best teams in their own conference.

By the end of the regular season Providence was considered a 'bubble team' for the NCAA Tournament and would need a very good performance in the Hockey East Tournament to improve their standing if they couldn't get an automatic bid. The first impediment for the team was Hockey East using a power index to decide conference placement rather than win percentage. This meant that Providence finished below Connecticut despite possessing a better record and would have to play a road game in the quarterfinals. The team was easily able to overcome that difficulty and defeated the Huskies 6–1. Their next opponent, Massachusetts, was not as easily beaten. After a good start, Providence was shut out over the final 50 minutes of play and lost 2–5.

Getting into the semifinal and losing to the eventual conference champion was a solid performance but Providence had a problem. Because there were little-to-no non-conference games for all of college hockey, the PairWise rankings would not be used. Instead, the NCAA selection committee decided to judge teams based upon how they performed against the best teams in their conference. Providence had lost both games to BC, gone 1–1 versus Boston University and 0–2–2 against Massachusetts (including the playoff match). This left the Friars with a 1–5–2 record against the 'good' Hockey East teams, which was not sufficient to earn them a trip to the national tournament.

Kyle Koopman and Jimmy Scannell sat out the season.

Departures

Recruiting

Current roster
As of February 12, 2021.

Standings

Schedule and results

|-
!colspan=12 style=";" | Regular Season

|-
!colspan=12 style=";" |

Scoring statistics

Goaltending statistics

Rankings

USCHO did not release a poll in week 20.

Awards and honors

Players drafted into the NHL

2021 NHL Entry Draft

† incoming freshman

References

Providence Friars men's ice hockey seasons
Providence Friars
Providence Friars
Providence Friars
Providence Friars
Providence Friars